"Plemyria" was also invalidly established by Hübner for another geometer moth genus; see Orthonama.

Plemyria is a genus of moths in the family Geometridae erected by Jacob Hübner in 1825.

Species
Plemyria rubiginata (Denis & Schiffermüller, 1775) – blue-bordered carpet
Plemyria georgii Hulst, 1896

References

Cidariini